Melissa Katherine Rycroft-Strickland (born March 11, 1983) is an American television personality, host, and dancer. She is a former Dallas Cowboys Cheerleader and TV Personality. She has participated as a bachelorette on the thirteenth season of ABC's The Bachelor, on the CMT reality TV series Dallas Cowboys Cheerleaders: Making the Team, and on the eighth and fifteenth seasons of ABC's Dancing with the Stars. Rycroft went on to host reality-TV competition shows such as Bachelor Pad and Redneck Island.

Early life 
Melissa Katherine Rycroft was born on March 11, 1983, in Dallas, Texas. She studied dance from an early age and served as first lieutenant of her high school drill team. She majored in marketing at the University of North Texas after transferring from the University of Oklahoma, where she was a member of Alpha Chi Omega.

Career

Dallas Cowboys Cheerleaders 
After graduating from the University of North Texas, Rycroft auditioned for the Dallas Cowboys Cheerleaders. She danced for the team from 2006 to 2008. As a cheerleader, she made regular appearances on Country Music Television's reality show Dallas Cowboys Cheerleaders: Making the Team. She also appears on the judging panel for the Dallas Cowboys Cheerleaders auditions and is also a showmanship mentor to the training camp candidates .

 The Bachelor
Rycroft appeared on the 13th season of The Bachelor as one of the 25 bachelorettes competing for bachelor Jason Mesnick. In the season finale, Mesnick chose Rycroft over runner-up Molly Malaney, and proposed. Shortly after the proposal, Mesnick left Rycroft, explaining he had feelings for Malaney. Mesnick and Malaney married in 2010.

 Dancing with the Stars

Rycroft first competed on season eight of Dancing with the Stars where she was partnered with Tony Dovolani and finished in third place. She and Dovolani once again served as partners in the All-Stars season and were announced as the winners on the season finale. She later served as the host of the 2015 Dancing with the Stars live tour. She later returned in season 27 as a trio partner to Juan Pablo Di Pace and Cheryl Burke.Dancing with the Stars Performances (Season 15)

Melissa & Tye
In 2012, Rycroft and her husband Tye Strickland starred in their own reality show titled Melissa & Tye on CMT. The show ran for one season (eight episodes), from  April 20, 2012, to June 8, 2012.

Logically Irrational
Rycroft and husband Tye Strickland launched a podcast with YEA Networks on November 8, 2018. “Logically Irrational” delves into relationships, family, pop culture and Reality TV. Episodes release each Thursday morning on iTunes.

Other shows
Rycroft is a host of CMT's reality-TV show Redneck Island. Rycroft left the Tribune morning show, Morning Dose, on June 1, 2018.

Personal life
Rycroft was briefly engaged to Jason Mesnick, whom she met on The Bachelor''. Mesnick called the engagement off after he admitted he was in love with runner-up, Molly Malaney. Rycroft then reunited with a former boyfriend, salesman Tye Strickland. The couple married and have three children: daughter Ava Grace, born February 16, 2011 and sons Beckett Thomas, born April 20, 2014, and Cayson Jack, born May 18, 2016.

References

External links
 

Living people
1983 births
American cheerleaders
American female dancers
Dancing with the Stars (American TV series) winners
National Football League cheerleaders
People from Dallas
Reality show winners
University of North Texas alumni
Bachelor Nation contestants